Suzanne Paxton (born December 27, 1969) is an American fencer. She competed in the women's individual and team foil events at the 1996 Summer Olympics.

See also
List of Pennsylvania State University Olympians

References

External links
 

1969 births
Living people
American female foil fencers
Olympic fencers of the United States
Fencers at the 1996 Summer Olympics
Sportspeople from Baltimore
21st-century American women